Ttrruuces (stylized in all caps) is an English psychedelic rock band, formed by Jules Apollinaire and Natalie Findlay in 2019. The band was based in London but then relocated to France for a year to fully immerse themselves in creating their debut album.

The band rock opera started as a project that focuses on two fictional characters and their quest to acquire a new drug named TTRRUUCES that will take them on a mind-altering journey.

The concept of their debut album has a narration throughout the eleven tracks accompanied by a video, with the project coming together to make a coming-of-age film, wherein Sadie (Sad Girl) and Syd (Lost Boy) are trying to find their way in an often bleak world.

History

Origins
Jules Apollinaire and Natalie Findlay first met in the summer of 2014. As they both lived on Broadway Market in East London, they started to hang out to later realize how alike they were.
Natalie said in an interview "Within days of meeting each other we started jamming and writing songs together and very fast we were living together making music all the time. We always knew we'd start a band together. After three years, the idea of TTRRUUCES was born."

When asked about the name and its meaning, Jules mentioned since he was a kid, he would play around with letters trying to find symmetries within the structure of words. "It was a bit obsessive so I made it into a whole game that continues until today. It's those mind games that made me write the word TTRRUUCES on a note. Natalie noticed it one day and loved it and we were like ‘ttrruuuuuces.’  We straight away wrote the song “TTRRUUCES” and adopted the name. The word stuck with us."

2019–present: Debut album 
On 18 October 2019, Ttrruuces released their first single "Sad Girl". Their debut album, Ttrruuces, followed in 2020.

Discography

Studio albums
 Ttrruuces (2020)

Singles
 "Sad Girl" (2019)
 "Ttrruuces" / "Lost Boy" (2020)
 "Sensations of Cool" (2020)
 "Evil Elephant" (2020)
 "I'm Alive" (2020)
 "You Make Me Feel Good" (2023)

References

English psychedelic rock music groups
English musical duos
Musical groups established in 2019
Musical groups from London
Rock music duos
2019 establishments in England